Till the End of Time may refer to:

Till the End of Time (song), a song by Buddy Kaye and Ted Mossman, recorded by a number of artists, notably Perry Como
Til the End of Time, a song by Cody Carnes
Till the End of Time (film), starring Dorothy McGuire and Guy Madison (1946)
 Star Ocean: Till the End of Time, a PlayStation 2 video game

See also
 Until the End of Time (disambiguation)''